SSL, formerly Space Systems/Loral, LLC (SS/L), of Palo Alto, California, is a wholly owned manufacturing subsidiary of Maxar Technologies.

SSL designs and builds satellites and space systems for a wide variety of government and commercial customers. Its products include high-powered direct-to-home broadcast satellites, commercial weather satellites, digital audio radio satellites, Earth observation satellites and spot-beam satellites for data networking applications.

History

The company was founded as the Western Development Laboratories (WDL) of Philco (Philco-Ford since 1966).  The Space Systems Division was made a stand-alone Division of Aeronutronic/Ford Aerospace/ and was acquired by Loral Corp. in 1990 for $715 million from Ford Motor Company, and renamed  Space Systems/Loral. All other divisions of Ford Aerospace including Western Development Labs now located in San Jose were also acquired by Loral at that time.

In 2012 Space Systems/Loral was acquired by the Canadian aerospace company MacDonald Dettwiler (now MDA) for $875 million.  MDA was renamed as Maxar Technologies in 2017.

SSL's major competitors are Boeing Satellite Systems, Lockheed Martin, Thales Alenia Space, Airbus Defence and Space and JSC Information Satellite Systems.

Projects
In 1960, the Courier 1B, built by then Philco, became the world's first active repeater satellite.

SSL has recently pioneered research in electric propulsion systems, lithium-ion power systems and the use of advanced composites on commercial satellites, which permit significant increases in the size and power of a satellite's payload and extends the satellite's on-orbit lifetime. SSL also has developed new service-enhancing technologies such as super power systems for direct-to-user applications and ground-based beam forming, a technology that uses both satellite and terrestrial assets to provide mobile users with increased coverage and capacity capabilities.

, there are 87 SSL-built geosynchronous satellites in orbit.

1300 Series Platform 

SSL manufactures satellites based on its SSL 1300 series platform (previously LS-1300, FS-1300) in Palo Alto. Satellites in the series include ProtoStar I, ICO G1, SIRIUS FM-6 and SES NEW SKIES NSS-12.  there were 80 satellites based on the 1300 series platform on orbit, with 1 more ready for launch and 21 others under construction.

The company designed and built AsiaSat 8, which was launched on 5 August 2014, and AsiaSat 6, which went into orbit on 7 September 2014. The two satellite launches cost AsiaSat $110 million. The satellites were expected to last 15 years, and contain high-powered C-band transponders providing video and broadband services to the Asia-Pacific region.

COTS proposal 
SSL and Constellation Services International have proposed a reusable space tug based on the 1300 platform and a pressure-fed, low-cost Aquarius Launch Vehicle. The tug would be used to bring supplies to the International Space Station as part of the Commercial Orbital Transportation Services (COTS) program.

NASA eventually decided to pursue another proposal for this project.  SSL, however, continues to provide Battery Orbital Replacement Units (ORUs), Battery Charge Discharge Units (BCDUs), and Sequential Shunt Units (SSUs) for the ISS.

LADEE Mission 
SSL designed and delivered a propulsion system based on their 1300 platform for the NASA LADEE mission. On April 17, 2014, between 9:30 p.m and 10:22 p.m. PDT, after successfully completing its goal to collect lunar dust and study the moon's atmosphere, NASA's Lunar Atmosphere and Dust Environment Explorer (LADEE) spacecraft successfully completed a planned de-orbit, bringing an end to the mission to study the structure and composition of the thin lunar atmosphere.

Robotic Servicing of Geosynchronous Satellites
In June 2017, SSL was awarded the contract to design and build the satellite servicing spacecraft vehicle for the US Defense Advanced Research Projects Agency (DARPA)’s Robotic Servicing of Geosynchronous Satellites (RSGS) program, which is designed to inspect, repair, and augment geosynchronous satellites and plans to include a refueling payload to extend the life of satellites that are low on propellant. SSL joined the Naval Research Laboratory, the Charles Draper Laboratory and Maxar's robotics divisions in Brampton, Ontario and Pasadena to develop the servicer. The servicer is designed to refuel commercial satellites, and global satellite operator SES is the first commercial customer to sign up to use the services for a satellite life extension mission.

In January 2019, SSL decided to abandon its participation in the program because of financial difficulties. Continued participation in the program required the company to fund the cost of the development by more than the typical 33%.

Psyche 
The Psyche mission to asteroid 16 Psyche spacecraft's solar-electric propulsion chassis will be built by Maxar.

See also 
 Aerospace manufacturer
 List of spacecraft manufacturers
 Aeronutronic

References

External links 
 SSL company website
 

Aerospace companies of the United States
Spacecraft manufacturers
Manufacturing companies based in the San Francisco Bay Area
Technology companies based in the San Francisco Bay Area
Companies based in Palo Alto, California
Manufacturing companies established in 1990
Technology companies established in 1990
1990 establishments in California
Loral Space & Communications
2012 mergers and acquisitions